Deadly Force is a 1983 American action film directed by Paul Aaron and written by Ken Barnett, Robert Vincent O'Neill and Barry Schneider. The film stars Wings Hauser, Joyce Ingalls, Paul Shenar, Al Ruscio, Arlen Dean Snyder and Lincoln Kilpatrick. The film was released on July 8, 1983, by Embassy Pictures.

Plot
A disgraced former police officer, named Stoney Cooper, returns to Los Angeles when a serial killer strikes close to home and vows to catch the murderer and win back his estranged wife.

Cast     
  
Wings Hauser as Stoney Cooper
Joyce Ingalls as Eddie Cooper
Paul Shenar as Joshua Adams
Al Ruscio as Sam Goodwin
Arlen Dean Snyder as Ashley Maynard
Lincoln Kilpatrick as Otto Hoxley
Bud Ekins as Harvey Benton
J. Víctor López as Diego
Hector Elias as Lopez
Ramón Franco as Jesus
Gina Gallego as Maria
Big Yank as Jefferson
Estelle Getty as Gussie
Victoria Vanderkloot as Beverly
Richard Beauchamp as Tony the Bomber
Paul Benjamin as Lester
Bill Berry as Jack
Eddie Braun as Eduardo
Flo Di Re as Stenographer
BJ Davis as Marty
Ned Eisenberg as Rat Game Owner
Bill Hart as Barrio Victim
Ray Lykins as Guard #1
Ben Mittleman as Harry
Estelle Moore as Ashley's Dame
Aaron Norris as Guard #3
Frank Ronzio as Sal Saluzzo
Ronald C. Ross as Guard #2 
Marion Russell as Hotel Maid
Vanna Salviati as Mrs. Hernandez
Ramon Sison as Coroner
Lenore Woodward as Ashley's Mother

References

External links
 
 

1983 films
American action films
1983 action films
Films directed by Paul Aaron
1980s English-language films
1980s American films